Pajo is a masculine given name, a diminutive form of Pavle or Pavao.

 Pajo Ivošević (born 1968), Serbian wrestler
 Pajo Kolarić (1821–1876), Croatian composer

See also
 Paja (given name), a diminutive of Pavle
 Pejo, a diminutive of Petar